Voivodeship road 116 (abbreviated DW 116) is a route in the Polish voivodeship roads network. The route links Nojewo with the cross road of the Voivodeship Road 184 and Voivodeship Road 186 near Dobrojewo.

Route plan

References

115